This is a list of universities and colleges in Latvia. The accrediting body for universities and colleges in Latvia is the 'Council of Higher Education' (Augstākās izglītības padome).

Institutions are divided into 'first-level vocational schools or colleges' (pirmā līmeņa profesionālās izglītības iestādes jeb koledžas) and Augstskola, a Latvian language term roughly translated as 'high school' or 'higher school', which covers institutions generally referred to as universities or tertiary colleges in English. Each category is further subdivided as follows:

Universities

State universities (Valsts universitātes) 
 University of Daugavpils
 Latvia University of Life Sciences and Technologies 
 Riga Stradiņš University 
 Riga Technical University
 University of Latvia
 University of Liepāja

State colleges (Valsts augstskolas) 
Latvian Academy of Art
BA School of Business and Finance (formerly the Banking College under the Bank of Latvia)
Jāzeps Vītols Latvian Academy of Music (formerly the Latvian Conservatory)
Latvian Academy of Culture (lv)
Latvian Academy of Sport Education
Latvian Maritime Academy 
National Defence Academy of Latvia
Rēzekne Academy of Technology 
Riga Teacher Training and Educational Management Academy (lv) (merged into University of Latvia from 2017)
 Ventspils University of Applied Sciences
Vidzeme University of Applied Sciences

Non-university type colleges (Neuniversitātes tipa augstskolas) 
Baltic International Academy (including the Baltic Psychology and Management College)
College of Economics and Culture (lv)
International School of Practical Psychology (lv)
ISMA University
Latvian Christian Academy (lv)
Luther Academy (lv)
Riga Aeronautical Institute (lv)
Riga Graduate School of Law (RGSL)
University of Business, Arts and Technology (formerly Riga International School of Economics and Business Administration)
School of Social Technologies
Stockholm School of Economics in Riga
Transport and Telecommunication Institute
Turība University

Vocational schools and colleges

State colleges (Valsts koledžas) 
Daugavpils Medical College (lv) (integrated into the University of Daugavpils from March 2018)
Fire Safety and Civil Defence College
Jēkabpils Agribusiness College
Latvian Cultural College at the Latvian Academy of Culture
Liepāja Maritime College
Malnava College (lv)
Olaine Mechanics and Technology College
Red Cross Medical College at Riga Stradiņš University (lv)
Riga 1st Medical College (lv)
Riga Building College
Riga Business College at the BA School of Business and Finance
Riga Medical College at the University of Latvia (lv)
Riga Technical College (lv)
State Agency for Social Integration College
State Border Guard College
State Police College (lv)
Stradiņš Medical College at the University of Latvia (lv)
 European Skill Training Institute

Colleges established with legal personality (Juridisko personu dibinātās koledžas) 
Albert College
Christian Leadership College
College of Accounting and Finance
College of Business Administration (lv)
College of Law
Cosmetology College
Latvian College of Business (lv)
Novikontas Maritime College

Foreign university affiliates (Ārvalstu augstskolu filiāles)  
Newport University CED, Latvia, affiliated with the Tomsk State University
Riga Higher Institute of Religious Sciences, under the Pontifical Lateran University
Riga Institute of Theology, under the Pontifical Lateran University

See also 
List of colleges and universities
List of colleges and universities by country
List of schools in Latvia
List of universities in Estonia
List of universities in Lithuania

External links
Links to Latvian colleges and universities at Council for Higher Education website

Universities
Universities in Latvia
Latvia
Uni
Latvia